Françoise Beaucournu-Saguez (1936–11 August 2000) was a French entomologist.

Biography
“Over two decades (1972-1992) she published many valuable studies on the simuliids of western Europe, North Africa and the Middle East.”

She was associated with the Department of Parasitology and Applied Zoology at the University of Rennes.

Her husband was the parasitologist Jean-Claude Beaucournu.

Works

References

1936 births
2000 deaths
20th-century French women
French entomologists
French women scientists